FRSM may refer to:

 Fellow of the Royal Society of Medicine,  Royal Society of Medicine is the professional membership body which is one of the major providers of accredited postgraduate medical education in the United Kingdom and home to one of the largest medical libraries in Europe.
 The eligible person for the Fellow of Royal Society of Medicine is as follows: You must have a medical, dental or veterinary qualification in the UK or abroad, recognised by GMC, GDC or RCVS or equivalent professional body.FY1 - ST8 grades are only applicable to those who have a medical, dental or veterinary qualification recognised by GMC, GDC or RCVS and are based in the UK or Republic of Ireland.If you obtained your medical, dental or veterinary qualification within the last 10 years and are not currently in a training position, the level of membership you select must correspond with how long you have been working, for example choosing ST1 equals working for up to 3 years.
 Fellow (or Fellowship) of the Associated Board of the Royal Schools of Music, the highest diploma level granted by the ABRSM (ranking above the ARSM, DipABRSM and the LRSM)